The 2007 Qatar Ladies Open, known as the 2007 Qatar Total Open, for sponsorship reasons, was a tennis tournament played on outdoor hard courts. It was the 7th edition of the Qatar Total Open, and was part of the Tier II Series of the 2007 WTA Tour. It took place at the Khalifa International Tennis and Squash Complex in Doha, Qatar, from 26 February through 4 March 2007.

Finals

Singles

 Justine Henin defeated  Svetlana Kuznetsova, 6–4, 6–2

Doubles

 Martina Hingis /  Maria Kirilenko defeated  Ágnes Szávay /  Vladimíra Uhlířová, 6–1, 6–1

External links
Official website
Singles, Doubles and Qualifying Singles Draws

Qatar Total Open
Qatar Ladies Open
2007 in Qatari sport